Harpactirella is a genus of African tarantulas that was first described by William Frederick Purcell in 1902. Originally placed with the brushed trapdoor spiders, it was transferred to the tarantulas in 1985.

It is considered a senior synonym of Luphocemus.

Species
 it contains 11 species, found in Africa:
Harpactirella domicola Purcell, 1903 – South Africa
Harpactirella helenae Purcell, 1903 – South Africa
Harpactirella karrooica Purcell, 1902 – South Africa
Harpactirella lapidaria Purcell, 1908 – South Africa
Harpactirella lightfooti Purcell, 1902 – South Africa
Harpactirella longipes Purcell, 1902 – South Africa
Harpactirella magna Purcell, 1903 – South Africa
Harpactirella overdijki Gallon, 2010 – South Africa
Harpactirella schwarzi Purcell, 1904 – South Africa
Harpactirella spinosa Purcell, 1908 – South Africa
Harpactirella treleaveni Purcell, 1902 (type) – South Africa

See also
 List of Theraphosidae species

References

Theraphosidae genera
Spiders of Africa
Theraphosidae